Algernon Percy Banks St. Maur, formerly Seymour, 14th Duke of Somerset, etc. (22 December 1813 – 2 October 1894) was the son of Edward St. Maur, 11th Duke of Somerset and Lady Charlotte Hamilton. He succeeded to the ducal title in 1891; he was also a baronet.

On 17 May 1845, he married Horatia Isabella Harriet Morier, daughter of John Philip Morier. They had four children:

Algernon St Maur, 15th Duke of Somerset (22 July 1846 – 29 October 1923)
Major Lord Percy St. Maur (11 November 1847 – 16 July 1907), m. the Hon. Violet White, daughter of Luke White, 2nd Baron Annaly and had issue.
Lord Ernest St. Maur (11 November 1847 – 21 May 1922)
Lord Edward St. Maur (7 February 1849 – 15 September 1920)

Ancestry

References

1813 births
1894 deaths
514
British landowners
Algernon Seymour, 14th Duke of SomersetA
19th-century British businesspeople
Younger sons of dukes